Olearia cuneifolia is a species of flowering plant in the family Asteraceae and is endemic to Queensland. It is an erect shrub with lance-shaped to wedge-shaped leaves and white, daisy-like inflorescences.

Description
Flowering has been observed in March, May, September and October and the fruit is a silky-hairy achene, the pappus with creamy-white bristles in two rows.

Taxonomy and naming
Olearia cuneifolia was first formally described in 2015 by Anthony Bean and Michael T. Mathieson in the journal  Austrobaileya from specimens collected by Mathieson near Mungallala. The specific epithet (cuneifolia) refers to the wedge-shaped leaves.

Distribution and habitat
This daisy bush grows in forest and woodland between Roma and Charleville in north Queensland.

Conservation status
Olearia cuneifolia is listed as of "least concern" under the Queensland Government Nature Conservation Act 1992.

References 

cuneifolia
Flora of New South Wales
Plants described in 2015
Taxa named by Anthony Bean